Grace Kemp (born 8 June 2001) is an Australian rugby union player. She plays for the Brumbies in the Super W competition.

Kemp was named in Australia's squad for the 2022 Pacific Four Series in New Zealand. She made her international debut for the Wallaroos against Canada on 18 June at Whangārei. She was then selected in the Wallaroos squad for a two-test series against the Black Ferns at the Laurie O'Reilly Cup.

Kemp made the Wallaroos side again for the delayed 2022 Rugby World Cup in New Zealand.

References

External links
Wallaroos Profile

2001 births
Living people
Australia women's international rugby union players
Australian female rugby union players
21st-century Australian women